Death by boiling is a method of execution in which a person is killed by being immersed in a boiling liquid. While not as common as other methods of execution, boiling to death has been practiced in many parts of Europe and Asia. Due to the lengthy process, death by boiling is an extremely painful method of execution.

Executions of this type were often carried out using a large vessel such as a cauldron or a sealed kettle filled with a liquid such as water, oil, tar, or tallow, and a hook and pulley system.

Historical practice

Europe

In England, the ninth statute passed in 1531 (the 22nd year of the reign of King Henry VIII) made boiling alive the prescriptive form of capital punishment for murder committed by poisoning, which by the same Act was defined as high treason. This arose from a February 1531 incident in which the Bishop of Rochester's cook, Richard Roose, gave several people poisoned porridge, resulting in two deaths. A partial confession having been extracted by torture, the sentence was thus imposed by attainder and without benefit of clergy. A contemporary chronicle reports the following:

Boiling to death was employed again in 1542 for a woman, Margaret Davy, who had also used poison. During the reign of Edward VI, in 1547, the 1531 act was repealed.

Numerous people have been boiled to death in Scotland. For example, with the consent of Jon Haraldsson, the "Bloody Earl" of Orkney, the bishop of Caithness, Adam of Melrose, and a monk named Surlo are said to have been boiled to death by angry husbandmen in 1222 over the bishop's aggressive means of collecting tithes. Alexander II is said to have executed upwards of eighty persons as a punishment for killing the bishop and monk, and the earl fled his lands. But according to the Melrose Chronicle, Adam of Melrose was "burned alive", rather than boiled, and Alexander III executed up to 400 for the crime against the clergy. 

William de Soules, a nobleman involved in a conspiracy against Robert the Bruce, was reputed to be a sorcerer consorting with evil spirits, and was boiled alive in 1321 at Ninestane Rig. Around 1420, Melville, the sheriff of the Mearns and laird of Glenbervie, who was resented for his strictness, was apprehended by some other nobles and thrown into the kettle. The nobles are said to have each taken a spoonful of the brew afterwards.

Boiling as an execution method was also used for counterfeiters, swindlers and coin forgers during the Middle Ages.
In the Holy Roman Empire, for example, being boiled to death in oil is recorded for coin forgers and extremely grave murderers. In 1392, a man was boiled alive in Nuremberg for having raped and murdered his own mother. Coin forgers were boiled to death in 1452 in Danzig and in 1471 in Stralsund. Even as late as 1687, a man in Bremen was boiled to death in oil for having been of valuable help to some coin forgers who had escaped justice.

In the Dutch town of Deventer, the kettle that was used for boiling criminals to death can still be seen.

Asia
In 16th-century Japan, the semi-legendary Japanese bandit Ishikawa Goemon and his son were boiled alive in the 1590s by Toyotomi Hideyoshi.

In 1675, a Sikh martyr called Bhai Dayala was boiled to death in Delhi after he refused to convert to Islam. He was put into a cauldron full of cold water which was then heated to boiling point. Sikh scriptures record that Dayala recited the Japji of Guru Nanak and the Sukhmani of Guru Arjan as he died.

Modern times
According to InSight Crime, of the 31,000 people killed by militants of Shining Path in Peru between 1980 and 2000, some were murdered by boiling.

The government of Uzbekistan under Islam Karimov has been alleged to have boiled suspected terrorists.

In a US Department of State document from 2004, the following is written:Former ISIS commander Abu Abboud al-Raqqawi referred to ISIS's brutal execution methods, among which was boiling prisoners alive in engine oil:

In the 2010 documentary El Sicario, Room 164, the masked sicario interviewee claims that the Mexican cartels boil those found to be working for the police in oil.

Depictions in Western culture
Early reports of cannibals from places in the Pacific, such as Fiji and Papua New Guinea, killing Western Christian missionaries were assumed to involve some form of boiling alive. This became a fertile ground for film makers and especially cartoonists, whose clichéd depiction of tourists or missionaries sitting restrained in a large cauldron above a wood fire and surrounded by bone-nosed tribesmen was a staple of popular magazines and films for decades. Examples include the television miniseries Shōgun, the 1985 film adaptation of King Solomon's Mines and the dream sequence in the film Bagdad Café.

Fromental Halévy's 1835 opera La Juive ends with Rachel (the title character) being boiled alive in a vat of oil after her relationship with the Christian prince Léopold is discovered by antisemitic state and church authorities.

References

External links 
 Human Rights Watch: Torture Worldwide: Uzbekistan

Boiling
Water torture